Carol Tessa Gould (née Firth; born 10 July 1944) is a retired female long-distance runner from England, who competed in the 1970s and early 1980s in the women's marathon and cross country events. She set her personal best (2:37:53) in the classic distance on 12 June 1982 in Windsor, finishing in second place behind Kathryn Binns.

Achievements

External links
ARRS
gbrathletics

1944 births
Living people
British female long-distance runners
British female marathon runners
20th-century British women